Gregory Kuznik (born June 12, 1978) is a Canadian-born Slovene former ice hockey player.

He was drafted 171st by the Hartford Whalers in the 1996 NHL Entry Draft. In the 2000–01 NHL season, he played one game for the Carolina Hurricanes.  Since 2003 he has played in Europe, spending two seasons in the British National League for the Fife Flyers and two seasons in Italy's Serie A league for Sportiva Hockey Club Fassa. In 2007, he moved to Slovenian team HDD Olimpija Ljubljana in the EBEL league.

He participated at the 2011 IIHF World Championship as a member of the Slovenia men's national ice hockey team.

Career statistics

References

External links

 

1978 births
Living people
Canadian ice hockey defencemen
Canadian people of Slovenian descent
Carolina Hurricanes players
Cincinnati Cyclones (IHL) players
Dayton Bombers players
Florida Everblades players
Hartford Whalers draft picks
HDD Olimpija Ljubljana players
Sportspeople from Prince George, British Columbia
Lowell Lock Monsters players
Seattle Thunderbirds players
SHC Fassa players
Slovenian ice hockey players
Ice hockey people from British Columbia
Canadian expatriate ice hockey players in Slovenia
Canadian expatriate ice hockey players in Italy